Franz Bücheler (3 June 18373 May 1908) was a German classical scholar, was born in Rheinberg, and educated at Bonn, where he was a student of Friedrich Ritschl (1806–1876).

Biography
In 1856 Bücheler graduated from the University of Bonn with a dissertation on linguistic studies of the Emperor Claudius. He held professorships successively at Freiburg (associate professor in 1858, full professor in 1862), Greifswald (from 1866), and Bonn (1870 to 1906). At Bonn, he worked closely with Hermann Usener (1834–1905).

Both as a teacher and as a commentator he was extremely successful. His research spanned the entirety of Greco-Roman antiquity, from poetry and sciences to the mundane aspects of everyday life. In 1878 he became joint-editor of the Rheinisches Museum für Philologie.

Among his editions are:
Frontini de aquis urbis Romae (Leipzig, 1858)
Pervigilium Veneris (Leipzig, 1859)
Petronii satirarum reliquiae (Berlin, 1862; 3rd ed., 1882)
Grundriss der lateinischen Deklination (1866)
Hymnus Cereris Homericus (Leipzig, 1869)
Q. Ciceronis reliquiae (1869)
Des Recht von Gortyn (Frankfort, 1885, with Ernst Zitelmann 1852-1923)
Herondae mimiambi (Bonn, 1892)
Petronii saturae et liber priapeorum (Berlin, 1904)

He also supervised the third edition (1893) of Otto Jahn's Persii, Juvenalis, Sulpiciae saturae.

References

1837 births
1908 deaths
German classical scholars
Academic staff of the University of Bonn
Academic staff of the University of Greifswald
Academic staff of the University of Freiburg
German classical philologists
Recipients of the Pour le Mérite (civil class)